Agioi Vavatsinias is a village in the Larnaca District of Cyprus, 3 km north of Ora. Its population in 2011 was 131.

Agioi Vavatsinias is the ancestral village of Manos Loïzos, who is considered to be one of the most important Greek Cypriot composers of the 20th century.

References

Communities in Larnaca District